Myroides odoratimimus is an obligate aerobic, gram negative bacterium. Although it has been isolated from a range of bodily fluids, it is a rare opportunistic pathogen. Myroides species are commonly found in the environment. Infections can occur following contact with contaminated water. In this context, pericardial effusion, pericarditis, pneumonia, soft tissue infection, septic shock, and urinary tract infection were already associated with these microorganisms. However, neurological infections were rarely reported in literature.

References

Further reading

External links 

LPSN
Type strain of Myroides odoratimimus at BacDive -  the Bacterial Diversity Metadatabase

Flavobacteria
Bacteria described in 1996